Gaspard de Ligondès was a French Navy officer. He served in the War of American Independence.

Biography 
Retz was born to a family from Auvergne. He joined the Navy as a Garde-Marine in 1741. He was promoted to Lieutenant in 1756, to Commander in 1767, to Captain in 1772.

In 1779, Retz captained the 64-gun Vengeur, part of the division under De Grasse sent to D'Estaing as reinforcement. Retz was wounded at the Battle of Grenada on 6 July 1779, and took part in the Siege of Savannah in September and October 1779. He also fought in the Battle of Martinique on 17 April 1780, where Vengeur, along with Destin and Saint Michel, directly engaged the much stronger Sandwich, under Rodney, HMS Cornwall and HMS Suffolk. 

In 1781, Retz captained the 74-gun Zodiaque in Brest. In 1782, he transferred to Robuste. The same year, he was promoted to Brigadier.

Retz retired from the Navy with the rank of Chef d'Escadre in 1786.

Sources and references 
 Notes

Citations

Bibliography
 
 

External links
 

French Navy officers
French military personnel of the American Revolutionary War